Privilege revocation can mean:

 In the context of computer security, Privilege revocation (computing)
 In a legal context, Privilege revocation (law)